Ipomoea gracilis is a plant in the bindweed family, Convolvulaceae. It is found in northern and north-eastern Australia.

References

gracilis
Flora of Australia